Starnberg station is a railway station in the municipality of Starnberg, in Bavaria, Germany. It is located on the Munich–Garmisch-Partenkirchen railway of Deutsche Bahn.

Services
 the following services stop at Starnberg:

References

External links
 
 Starnberg layout 
 

Railway stations in Bavaria
Buildings and structures in Starnberg (district)
Munich S-Bahn stations